Robin of the Wood is a maze game published in 1985 for a few 8-bit computer formats by Odin Computer Graphics in the UK and Serma Software in Spain. It was based on the English legend of Robin Hood.

Reception
Crash (magazine) awarded the game 94%, giving it a Crash Smash, with the reviewer positively saying "This game is one of the most addictive I’ve played and I would recommend it to anyone."

References

External links

1985 video games
Commodore 64 games
Maze games
Robin Hood video games
Video games developed in the United Kingdom
Video games scored by Fred Gray
ZX Spectrum games